Carol Vita is a Republican former New Hampshire state representative from the Strafford 3rd District. In 2011 she endorsed Republican presidential candidate Ron Paul.

Vita was a sponsor for a lawsuit to have Barack Obama dropped from the New Hampshire Presidential race in 2012, claiming that Obama was not born in the United States.

References

External links
Carol Vita at New Hampshire House of Representatives website

Members of the New Hampshire House of Representatives
Living people
21st-century American politicians
Year of birth missing (living people)